Basis may refer to:

Finance and accounting 
Adjusted basis, the net cost of an asset after adjusting for various tax-related items
Basis point, 0.01%, often used in the context of interest rates
Basis trading, a trading strategy consisting of the purchase of a security and the sale of a similar security
Basis of futures, the value differential between a future and the spot price
Basis (options), the value differential between a call option and a put option
Basis swap, an interest rate swap
Cost basis, in income tax law, the original cost of property adjusted for factors such as depreciation
Tax basis, cost of an asset

and technology 
Basis function
Basis (linear algebra)
Dual basis
Orthonormal basis
Schauder basis
Basis (universal algebra)
Basis of a matroid
Generating set of an ideal:
Gröbner basis
Hilbert's basis theorem
Generating set of a group
Base (topology)
Change of basis
Greedoid
Normal basis
Polynomial basis
Radial basis function
Standard basis
Transcendence basis of a field extension
Basis database

Chemistry
Basis (crystal structure), the positions of the atoms inside the unit cell
Basis set (chemistry)
Dry basis, an expression of a calculation in which the presence of water is ignored

Organizations
Bangladesh Association of Software and Information Services
Basis Educational Group
Basis Schools, a group of schools in Arizona, Washington, D.C., and Texas
Basis Technology Corp., a text analytics company

People
Dimitris Basis, Greek singer
Liron Basis (born 1974), Israeli footballer

See also

Base (disambiguation)
Basic (disambiguation)
Basis of Union (disambiguation)
Basis set (disambiguation)